Tony McDonnell is a Professor (Emeritus) of Planetary and Space Sciences.  
Specialising in space science and a recognised authority in cosmic dust, he was 
Professor of Space Sciences at the University of Kent and Professor of Planetary and Space Sciences at the Open University.

Space Science
Tony McDonnell started his career at the Jodrell Bank Observatory, providing the opportunity for space research, where innovative 
satellite-borne detectors were developed to measure the threat to survival in space environments. They were to be his career speciality.

Following a NASA fellowship, he joined the University of Kent in 1967 and, over 30 years, successfully developed the Unit for 
Space Sciences and Astronomy. His research included analysis of moon rocks from NASA Apollo Programme and USSR Luna missions; hypervelocity impacts and 
specialised facilities; experiments during Giotto’s flyby of Halleys Comet; and interplanetary explorations by the Ulysses and Galileo probes.  Together with Peter Tsou and Don Brownlee, he was the first to demonstrate the intact capture of space particulates in aerogel, the baseline technique used in the Stardust Mission.
He has played a significant role in the UK framework and funding for the exploration of space, including the Rosetta, Stardust, 
Cassini/Huygens missions and the International Space Station facilities.  In 1984, the International Astronomical Union named asteroid 9159 McDonnell after him.  He is also author of Cosmic Dust, a milestone in Solar System Cosmic Dust Research.

In 2000, he and his team moved from the University of Kent to form the UK’s largest space team at the Open University and triggered the building of the Planetary and Space Sciences Research Institute.

He is now retired and working on a barn renovation in Dordogne, France. A friend has helped.

References
http://stardust.jpl.nasa.gov/news/bio_mcdonnell.html
https://web.archive.org/web/20060715010117/http://pssri.open.ac.uk/gucs2004/tonybook.pdf

Year of birth missing (living people)
Living people
Academics of the University of Kent
Academics of the Open University
British space scientists